First Baptist Church is a historic Baptist church located at Salem, Washington County, Indiana.  It was built in 1900, and is a Richardsonian Romanesque style brick and stone church.  It has a central gabled nave and a three-story corner tower with a pyramidal roof.

It was listed on the National Register of Historic Places in 1985. It is also a contributing property in the Salem Downtown Historic District which was NRHP-listed in 1997.

References

Baptist churches in Indiana
Individually listed contributing properties to historic districts on the National Register in Indiana
Churches on the National Register of Historic Places in Indiana
Churches completed in 1890
19th-century Baptist churches in the United States
Romanesque Revival church buildings in Indiana
Richardsonian Romanesque architecture in Indiana
Buildings and structures in Washington County, Indiana
National Register of Historic Places in Washington County, Indiana